The Return of Carol Deane is a 1938 British drama film directed by Arthur B. Woods and starring Bebe Daniels, Arthur Margetson and Peter Coke. The film is adapted from the story The House on 56th Street by Joseph Santley and spans the time period from the 1910s to the 1930s. It was made at Teddington Studios by the British subsidiary of Warner Brothers. The film's sets were designed by the art director Peter Proud.

Plot
In the London of 1912,  Carol Deane (Daniels) becomes famous for a portrait of her painted by artist Mark Poynton (Arthur Margetson), who is infatuated with her.  Carol however marries Lord Robert Brenning (Michael Drake), much to the chagrin of Poynton.  She gives birth to a son then with the outbreak of World War I, Lord Robert goes off to fight on the Western Front while Carol becomes a nurse.  Poynton is admitted as a patient to Carol's hospital, and tells her he is still in love with her.  Carol tries to make light of his persistence, but after being released Poynton calls her to insist that she come to see him, threatening that if she does not, he will make her the subject of a public scandal.  Carol goes to visit Poynton, who pulls a gun on her, demanding that she return to live with him.  There is a struggle, during which Carol accidentally shoots Poynton dead.

Carol goes on trial for murder and Lord Robert is summoned as a character witness, but is killed in action before the trial begins.  Carol is found not guilty of murder but guilty of manslaughter, and is sentenced to a lengthy term of imprisonment.  Her son grows up knowing nothing of his mother or her crime, and on her release in the late 1920s Carol relocates to New York.  She meets Englishman Francis Scott-Vaughan (Wyndham Goldie) and becomes involved in his shady gambling businesses.  Ten years later the pair return to England to set up a similar establishment in London.  On the opening evening she recognises one of the punters as her son (Peter Coke), now married and whose photographs she has seen in newspapers.  He has the air of a compulsive gambler, and Carol engineers proceedings to prevent him from losing large sums of money in wagers.  She takes him under her wing and helps him repair his relationship with his wife, who had been aghast to discover his gambling habits.  Carol never reveals that she is his mother, and soon contact between them is lost again.

Cast
 Bebe Daniels as Carol Deane
 Arthur Margetson as Mark Poynton
 Peter Coke as Lord David Brenning
 Michael Drake as Lord Robert Brenning
 Zena Dare as Lady Brenning
 Chili Bouchier as Anne Dempster
 David Burns as Nick Wellington
 Aubrey Mallalieu as Lamont
 Wyndham Goldie as Francis Scott-Vaughan
 Lesley Brook as Diana
 Ian McLean as Prosecution

References

External links 
 
 

1938 films
1938 drama films
Films directed by Arthur B. Woods
1930s English-language films
British black-and-white films
British drama films
Films set in London
Films shot at Teddington Studios
Warner Bros. films
1930s British films